Arthur Jenkins may refer to:
Arthur Jenkins (musician) (1936–2009), American keyboardist, composer, arranger and percussionist
Arthur Jenkins (politician) (1884–1946), Welsh miners' leader and Member of Parliament for Pontypool
Arthur G. Jenkins (1887–1963), Australian cricket umpire
Arthur L. Jenkins, American neurosurgeon